25 Years Celebration is a double album by The Dubliners. Recorded in 1987 and charted in the UK at No.43 and No.1 in Ireland. The album released following a special Late Late Show appearance by the group, 25 Years Celebration featured a number of special guests and featured "The Irish Rover", a collaboration with The Pogues, which returned The Dubliners to Top Of The Pops 20 years after they first performed "Seven Drunken Nights" on that show.

Track listing

Chart performance

References

The Dubliners albums
1987 albums